Pryteria alboatra is a moth in the family Erebidae. It was described by Walter Rothschild in 1909. It is found in Costa Rica, French Guiana, Venezuela, Peru, Brazil and Bolivia.

Subspecies
Pryteria alboatra alboatra (Brazil)
Pryteria alboatra borussica (Seitz, 1921) (Bolivia)
Pryteria alboatra intensa (Rothschild, 1935) (Costa Rica)

References

Moths described in 1909
Phaegopterina